European Parliament elections were held in France on 26 May 2019 (and on 25 May in parts of overseas France and for some nationals abroad), electing members of the 9th French delegation to the European Parliament as part of the elections held across the European Union. The election featured two major changes since the 2014 election: the return to a single national constituency and the increase in the number of French seats from 74 to 79 upon the withdrawal of the United Kingdom from the European Union. Officially, 79 MEPs were considered to have been elected, including five "virtual" MEPs who did not take their seats until the UK formally left the EU. The election featured 34 separate electoral lists, a record number at the national level.

It was the first national election in France since the election of Emmanuel Macron as president and therefore his first major electoral test, taking place amid dismal approval ratings. For his party, Nathalie Loiseau led the Renaissance list of La République En Marche!, Democratic Movement (MoDem), Agir, and the Radical Movement which ultimately arrived in second with 22.42% of the vote, behind the National Rally (RN) list led by the 23-year-old Jordan Bardella which received 23.34% of the vote, with a lower vote percentage but more overall votes than its 2014 result.

Turnout, at just over 50%, was the highest since the 1994 elections. Led by Yannick Jadot, Europe Ecology – The Greens (EELV) managed a surprise third-place finish with 13.48% of the vote, short of its score in the 2009 elections in which it also achieved a surprise result. At the same time, the list of The Republicans (LR) led by the 33-year-old Catholic philosopher François-Xavier Bellamy ended up with a historically poor result of just 8.48% of the vote and the loss of 12 MEPs despite expectations of a strong electoral dynamic created by Bellamy's selection as the party's lead candidate. Similarly, the results were also a significant disappointment for Jean-Luc Mélenchon's La France Insoumise, which fell far short of both its presidential and legislative results in 2017 with only 6.31% of the vote, narrowly ahead of the joint list between the Socialist Party (PS), Place Publique, and New Deal led by Raphaël Glucksmann (the first time in its history the PS did not lead an autonomous list), which managed to remain in the European Parliament with its score of 6.19% of the vote, slightly above the 5% threshold needed for seats.

Numerous other lists fell short of the 5% threshold, including Nicolas Dupont-Aignan's Debout la France (DLF) and Benoît Hamon's Génération.s, the scores of which (both slightly above 3%) nevertheless allow their campaign expenses to be compensated by the state. The two were closely followed by the centre-right Union of Democrats and Independents (UDI) led by Jean-Christophe Lagarde and the French Communist Party (PCF) led by Ian Brossat. The recently founded Animalist Party, an animal rights party, also created a small surprise with its score of 2.16%, comparable to some of the more prominent lists, despite its limited presence in the campaign. The only two notable pro-Frexit parties received 1.82% of the vote combined. Other lists included Urgence Écologie, consisting of several small green parties, led by Dominique Bourg (garnering 1.82% of the vote); Lutte Ouvrière with 0.78% of the vote; and a list of gilets jaunes which collected 0.54% of the vote.

Background

Electoral system 

Starting from the 2004 elections, France was divided into eight large regional electoral constituencies for the purposes of European Parliament elections with members elected by proportional representation. The electoral system changed ahead of the 2019 election, with broad support in the French political class for a return to a national vote. On 29 November, Prime Minister Édouard Philippe announced that all parties consulted except for The Republicans supported returning to national lists, and confirmed the intention of the government to prepare a bill to change the voting system to that end, which was officially unveiled on 3 January 2018, preserving the 5% threshold for representation and 3% for reimbursement of campaign expenses. The possibility of transnational lists following the withdrawal of the United Kingdom from the European Union was also considered. The return to national lists in effect benefits smaller parties which were previously disadvantaged by the system of large regional constituencies, while larger parties would win fewer seats.

The bill creating a single national constituency was approved by a vote the National Assembly vote on the first reading on 20 February 2018, and the Senate officially adopted the bill on 23 May 2018, which was promulgated on 25 June after its validation by the Constitutional Council.

Dates 
As the European elections are scheduled from 23 to 26 May 2019 and French votes are traditionally held on Sundays, the date of the 2019 European election in France was confirmed to be 26 May 2019. Declarations of lists and candidacies were to be submitted between 23 April and 3 May 2019, while voting in some of the overseas territories and for nationals in the Americas officially took place on 25 May 2019.

Number of seats 
On 23 January 2018, the European Parliament Committee on Constitutional Affairs adopted a proposal to reduce the size of the hemicycle from 751 to 705, splitting 27 former British seats between 14 underrepresented member states of which France was set to gain 5, increasing its representation from 74 to 79. On 7 February, the European Parliament voted 368 to 274 against the principle of reallocating British seats to transnational lists, though the idea's fate was ultimately in the hands of the European Council.

After the agreement on 10 April to postpone the British departure from the EU to 31 October, the participation of the United Kingdom in the European Parliament elections will mean that the number of elected MEPs will remain fixed at 74 until the eventual withdrawal of the UK. As a result, legislation to "provide for two phrases", one with 74 MEPs, and later with 79 in total, was tabled on 24 April; electoral lists will still require 79 candidates, of which 74 will take their seats immediately and the remaining 5 "virtual" MEPs upon the departure of the UK from the EU.

Broadcast campaign 

The length of campaign clips for each list was determined by its declared support among national parliamentarians (senators, deputies, and MEPs), a change largely to the benefit of the governing majority at the expense of opposition parties.

From 15 April 2019, the Conseil supérieur de l'audiovisuel (CSA) ensured that all candidates receive a fair distribution of time in broadcast media, with the exact timing monitored by stations themselves and speaking time relayed every Monday until the elections. The campaign officially commenced on 13 May.

Televised debates 
Hamon appealed against his exclusion from the France 2 debate on 4 April on 27 March, questioning the choice not to invite him given the inclusion of other lead candidates; this came after the earlier non-invitation of Brossat and Lagarde. He was joined in his case by Philippot and Asselineau, with the Paris administrative court subsequently ordering France 2 to invite the three to its debate, judging France Télévisions's excuse that Hamon's views were sufficiently represented by the invitation of Glucksmann to have been insufficient.

France Télévisions contested this decision, and although the Conseil d'État ultimately ruled that France 2 was not obligated to invite the three, France 2 maintained its invitation out of courtesy. This first debate was watched by only 1.62 million viewers, representing an audience share of 9.8%.

On 9 April, just before the debate hosted by RFI and France 24, the RN announced Bardella would not participate in the debate, taking issue with its format and apparent lack of preparedness on the part of the hosts. As Mélenchon was unable to appear on the CNews debate on 10 April due to a planned campaign meeting, Adrien Quatennens was invited to take his place instead.

The decision of to split the debate on 22 May, hosted by France 2 and France Inter, into two separate segments provoked consternation among those invited to the second part, as did the choice not to invite the lead candidates of three of the principal lists (Bellamy, Loiseau, and Bardella) but their party leaders (Wauquiez, Guerini, and Le Pen) instead. On 14 May, Brossat said he would file an appeal with the CSA to intervene in the debate, while Hamon castigated France Télévisions president Delphine Ernotte for the decision, with Lagarde, Dupont-Aignan, and Philippot also denouncing the arrangement. On 15 May, Hamon, Lagarde, and Dupont-Aignan held a joint press conference in front of the France Télévisions headquarters to announce that they would boycott the debate unless its format was modified, and Yahoo! later announced that the three would participate in a debate on its site before the debate that evening, hosted by Clément Viktorovitch. The LCI debate on 20 May was held in a similar fashion, with the first part dedicated to "small" lists and the later part of the evening reserved for the "main" ones.

Meanwhile, doubts about her performance meant Loiseau would not appear at the debate hosted by France 2, but rather Bayrou, while some considered inviting Canfin to the LCI debate. On 19 May, both Canfin and Loiseau demanded that the three final debates feature live fact-checking in spite of logistical difficulties.

Other events 
On 23 September 2018, the national congress of the Association of Rural Mayors of France (Association des maires ruraux de France, or AMRF) announced that they would refuse to directly transmit the results of the elections to the state on the night of the election to voice their discontent with the lack of attention given by the government to rural policy.

The 3 February 2019 edition of Le Journal du Dimanche revealed that Macron was interested in holding a referendum concurrent with the European elections on 26 May to conclude the grand débat national (great national debate) and end the gilets jaunes protests. The opposition, suspicious about the referendum's timing, expressed skepticism, and the idea also lacked support from members of the government.

Following the Notre-Dame de Paris fire on 15 April, several parties briefly suspended their campaigns for the European elections.

Outgoing delegation 

The table below shows the composition of the delegation of France to the European Parliament as of 3 May 2019. MEPs marked with an asterisk (*) are not standing as candidates; those marked with two asterisks (**) are candidates, but only in a clearly non-electable position near the end of electoral lists.

Electoral lists

Summary 
The table below is a summary of the main parties contesting the 2019 European elections in France.

Lutte Ouvrière 

The leadership of the New Anticapitalist Party (NPA) initially voted in favor of a common list with Lutte Ouvrière (LO), with its national political council on 6 and 7 October 2018 voting 37–22 (with 5 abstentions and 10 non-participants) in favor of an alliance in the 2019 European elections; however, in November 2018, the parties acknowledged the failure to arrive to an agreement for a common list. The annual party congress of Lutte Ouvrière on 8 and 9 December voted to present an autonomous list, with spokeswoman and former presidential candidate Nathalie Arthaud announcing that she would be its lead candidate. Arthaud said the party refused an alliance with the NPA because the interests of workers were not a priority for the latter, and because she did not want to run a campaign on "all the struggles that can be fought, from ecology to feminism".

French Communist Party 

On 1 December 2017, Pierre Laurent, national secretary of the French Communist Party (PCF), stated that he wanted to gather "the strongest possible left group" for the 2019 European elections, launching an appeal to Jean-Luc Mélenchon of La France Insoumise and Benoît Hamon of Génération.s. The national council of the PCF on 30 and 31 March approved the principle of a "common platform" including various left-wing groups as well as members of civil society and intellectuals, postponing discussion of electoral strategy. On 3 June, Ian Brossat, deputy for housing to Socialist mayor of Paris Anne Hidalgo, was selected as the leader of the PCF list. On 14 June, the PCF again called for a common list of the left in an open letter addressed to parties on the left, excluding the Socialist Party (PS). In December, Fabien Roussel, recently elected leader of the party, indicated that he did not necessarily support a common list given disagreements between left-of-centre parties, and indicated that an alliance with Hamon would only occur if Brossat led the list. On 26 January, the PCF officially unveiled its list, voted on by party members from 31 January to 2 February. It includes two incumbent MEPs (Patrick Le Hyaric and Marie-Pierre Vieu), trade unionist Marie-Hélène Bourlard in second position (featured in the documentary film Merci patron! by sitting France Insoumise deputy François Ruffin), and is half composed of workers.

La France Insoumise 

At the convention of his movement on 25 November 2017, Jean-Luc Mélenchon announced that La France Insoumise would present a list in 2019, considering the elections a "referendum on the European question" to "break the chains, exit the European budgetary treaties". The movement negotiating an alliance with the Spanish party Podemos and the Portuguese Left Bloc in Lisbon on 12 April 2018. At the national level, Mélenchon continued to refuse any alliance with either Hamon's movement or the French Communist Party (PCF). He announced on 11 March 2018 that he himself would not be a candidate.

The movement published an unordered list of candidates on 5 June, with Charlotte Girard and Manuel Bompard guaranteed spots as the presumptive list leaders, in first and second position, respectively, and Younous Omarjee as the sole incumbent MEP. The movement received 637 applications, of which 506 were submitted by men and 131 by women; the electoral committee then ensured the demographic parity of the applicants. The resulting list was then submitted feedback until July, when the list was ranked, with another nine spots on the list reserved for members of civil society and trade unions and associations. On 4 July, following a meeting of the electoral committee on 30 June, the movement published an updated list consisting of 66 candidates, with 13 spots reserved for members of civil society.

The list produced by the electoral committee was met with criticism by dissatisfied activists, including Liêm Hoang-Ngoc of the "insubordinate Socialists", who "suspended" his movement's participation; former electoral committee member Lilian Guelfi, who denounced alleged favoritism by Manuel Bompard; and Sarah Soilihi and François Cocq, who withdrew their candidacies following its publication. Djordje Kuzmanovic later quit the movement in November following his removal from the list after sexist remarks. Nevertheless, the consultation of activists from 4 to 20 July resulted in its approval by 86.97% of participants. After Emmanuel Maurel and Marie-Noëlle Lienemann quit the PS in mid-October. the pair formed a new political party close to the Citizen and Republican Movement (MRC), the Republican and Socialist Left (GRS), in early 2019. On 15 October, MRC president Jean-Luc Laurent announced an alliance with Maurel and Lienemann to create a common list with La France Insoumise, with Maurel leaving the social democratic group in the European Parliament. In April 2019, political scientist Thomas Guénolé, in 14th position, accused La France insoumise of being "a dictatorship" : the party reacted by saying he was accused of sexual harassment and removed him from the list.

On 15 November, Girard confirmed that she would neither lead the list nor be a candidate in 2019, and appeared to imply that she was sidelined. On 9 December, the movement officially voted to approve its list of 79 candidates and designate Manon Aubry, a 29-year-old tax evasion specialist and spokeswoman at Oxfam France, as its lead candidate. Manuel Bompard, campaign director, was second on the list, followed by Leïla Chaibi and outgoing MEP Younous Omarjee. Emmanuel Maurel, who quit the PS for an alliance with the movement, appeared in sixth, with Mélenchon in the symbolic penultimate position and Girard last. According to Aubry, their list included several active gilets jaunes. As in the 2017 presidential campaign, the movement used holograms to hold virtual meetings in 471 small towns throughout France (via "holovans"). Unable to secure financing, Mélenchon called for supporters to participate in a "people's loan" to fund their campaign, collective 1.5 million euros within five days, and reaching 2 million euros by 10 April, with an average loan of 700 euros.

Génération.s 

On 21 January 2018, Benoît Hamon announced alongside former Greek finance minister Yanis Varoufakis of DiEM25 that Génération.s would contest the 2019 European elections. On 10 March, Hamon called for the creation of the "first pan-European transnational list" alongside Razem in Poland, The Alternative in Denmark, and LIVRE in Portugal, publishing a common manifesto in June.

Hamon sought to invite Élise Lucet, host of Cash Investigation on France 2, as a lead candidate, but was rebuffed. Audrey Pulvar was also contacted, but indicated that she was not interested, as was the case with Christiane Taubira. The movement communicated with the Greens and PCF, even if the possibility of an alliance between the three was unlikely, and Noël Mamère remained a possible "consensus candidate" in an alliance with the Greens, given his membership of both formations, but ruled out running on 25 June 2018. On 29 October, the movement launched a call for applications for prospective candidates from civil society, receiving between 300 and 400 applications. In mid-November 2018, incumbent MEP Édouard Martin confirmed that he would not seek a second term.

In an interview published in Le Monde on 6 December, Hamon confirmed that he would be the lead candidate of a "citizen alliance", and subsequently closed the door to an alliance with the PS on 7 January 2019, citing its membership of the Party of European Socialists (PES). Le Journal du Dimanche reported that top candidates would also include MEPs  and Isabelle Thomas, ex-La France Insoumise member Sarah Soilihi, spokeswoman Aurore Lalucq, and community activist Salah Amokrane. In an interview published in Le Monde in early February, Hamon proposed that the left hold a "citizen vote" in April to select a common list and program, though only New Deal,  (LRDG), and the Movement of Progressives (MdP) were receptive to the idea. Hamon then announced on 23 February that he would lead an independent list, revealing the first thirty candidates on the list on 26 February. Lalucq later quit, announcing on 18 March that she would join Place Publique. The movement indicated it was 600,000 euros short of financing its campaign, and considered soliciting donations via a "citizen bank".

Socialist Party, Place Publique, and Nouvelle Donne 

Early on, a number of PS heavyweights declined to lead the list, including Najat Vallaud-Belkacem, Pierre Moscovici, Stéphane Le Foll, Olivier Faure, Christiane Taubira, Paul Magnette, François Hollande, Bernard Cazeneuve, Ségolène Royal, Jean-Christophe Cambadélis, and Christian Eckert. Julien Dray declared his candidacy, and Emmanuel Maurel was also reportedly approached to lead the list, and did not rule out the possibility at the time. Gabrielle Siry, and Sylvie Guillaume were also considered potential list leaders.

In preparation for the elections, the PS began drafting its platform in May 2018, launching a "digital collaborative platform", laruchesocialiste.fr, which only elicited 337 responses from 272 people in two months. Disagreements on the left wing of the party on the final form of the program persisted through September, despite commitments to create a left-wing and ecologist "intergroup" in the European Parliament, halt any new free trade treaties, and vote against the Comprehensive Economic and Trade Agreement (CETA) with Canada. The text marked a new approach for the PS, arguing in favor of more social and environmental controls in trade agreements and a revision of the European treaties led by the left. Faure also affirmed that the PS would not support the candidacy of Frans Timmermans as Spitzenkandidat. In an interview with Le Monde published on 12 October, Maurel quit the PS and castigated its failure to represent socialism, soon followed by Marie-Noëlle Lienemann the following day, with the creating a new left-wing party associated with Citizen and Republican Movement (MRC) in 2019, the Republican and Socialist Left (GRS).

On 15 December 2018, at the ending of a meeting of the national council of the PS, Faure for the first time proposed that the party participate in a "rally" of forces on the left. After Royal ruled out standing as a candidate of a common list on 11 January, Faure indicated he would be ready to lead a PS list if necessary. Raphaël Glucksmann, who co-founded Place Publique in an effort to unite the left, was offered the position of lead candidate. On 13 February, the national office of the party approved of Faure's plans to seek an alliance with Place Publique, and Glucksmann officially announced his intention to lead a list in the European elections on 15 March, with the national council of the PS voting to designate Glucksmann as lead candidate the following day, with 128 votes in favor, 5 against, and 35 abstentions (including Stéphane Le Foll and Luc Carvounas). The list is composed of half PS candidates and half those of other parties and figures from civil society, marking the first time since 1979 the PS did not lead its own list in the European elections.

New Deal officially announced its support for the list on 18 March 2019, as did ex-Génération.s spokeswoman Aurore Lalucq. After receiving 215 applications from party officials by 26 October 2018, the PS approved a list of 20 women and 20 men as candidates in the European elections on 27 March 2019, with 23 votes in favor and 11 against; Le Foll, Carvounas, Martine Aubry, and their allies expressed displeasure at the list, as did a number of candidates and outgoing MEPs, who denounced the diluted list (given the number of PS candidates in non-electable positions). After initially coming to an agreement, Virginie Rozière's  (LRDG) quit the list on 29 April, following pressure from their former PRG colleagues towards PS not to welcome the LRDG splitters while PRG was itself cancelling its merger into Macron-leaning Radical Movement. On 5 May, Le Parisien reported that Christiane Taubira would back the list, appearing alongside Glucksmann on 15 May.

Europe Ecology – The Greens 

On 27 February 2018, MEP Yannick Jadot stated that EELV would seek to present an independent list in 2019. Both Jadot and fellow MEP Michèle Rivasi opposed a rapprochement with Hamon like that in the 2017 presidential election. Among outgoing MEPs, José Bové, Eva Joly, and Pascal Durand did not intend to seek a third mandate. Durand, a supporter of Nicolas Hulot, was seen as open to working with La République En Marche!, as was Karima Delli, despite her denial of any such intentions, and on 13 April, she expressed her desire to lead the EELV list. Durand, on the other hand, ultimately joined the La République En Marche list. Other candidates reportedly included David Cormand, Julien Bayou, Marie Toussaint, and Mounir Satouri. On 19 December, Ségolène Royal offered to join the EELV list in second position, but was rejected the following day.

Given the difficulty in finding a potential list leader, Noël Mamère was named a possible "consensus candidate" in an alliance with Hamon, but later declined on 25 June. On 9 and 10 June, the federal council of the party agreed to put forth provisional lists to be submitted to a membership vote from 11 to 16 July, and the outlines of the party's plans for the 2019 elections were presented from 23 to 25 August. Two possible lists were created – one led by Jadot and the other by Rivasi – with the names of Damien Carême and Julien Bayou removed after later revisions. On 16 July, the party announced that Jadot won the vote with 58.69% of votes against 35.59% for Rivasi, and subsequently reaffirmed that he would not ally with Hamon again in the European elections. On 23 September, the EELV federal council agreed to place Damien Carême, mayor of Grande-Synthe, 3rd on the EELV list, and Alexis Tiouka, a former representative to the UN for the rights of indigenous peoples, later joined the list, becoming the first-ever Native American on a European electoral list. In an interview on 25 February 2019, Jadot announced the addition of regional councilor Benoît Biteau to the list in 11th position.

Régions et Peuples Solidaires planned to contest the elections but left open the possibility of allying with the Greens, and on 16 February 2019 announced it was an alliance, with former MEP François Alfonsi as well as Lydie Massard and Anne-Marie Hautant joining the list. On 23 February, the Independent Ecological Alliance (AEI) duly announced that it reached an agreement with the EELV, with Caroline Roose and Salima Yenbou within the top 10 electable places on the list.

The Greens intend to target both ex-Socialists and disappointed Macron voters who view his government's policies as too right-wing. Jadot has sought to portray the EELV as neither left nor right but "central", attempting to represent a "pragmatic" German-style ecology and create an "ecologist pole" as opposed to the "productivist" and "populist" poles, saying that "ecology is not the left". The Greens, led by Jadot, also unveiled their plans for a "Green New Deal", a name borrowed from the American left, proposing dedicating 100 billion euros to investments in renewable energy and home insulation to achieve 100% electricity generation from renewables within 20 years.

La République En Marche and allies 

In March 2019, Les Échos reported that the choice of lead candidate was to be made internally between either health minister Agnès Buzyn or European affairs minister Nathalie Loiseau. Loiseau officially announced she would seek the nomination for lead candidate following her debate with Marine Le Pen on the set of L'Émission politique on 14 March, while Les Échos and Le Parisien later reported that Buzyn withdrew her name from consideration. Loiseau was officially designated as lead candidate on 26 March as the list of the first 30 candidates was unveiled. Alain Juppé was the subject of early speculation regarding his potential candidacy to lead the list, though confirmed on 19 March 2018 that he would not stand, and his appointment to the Constitutional Council precluded his participation in the campaign, but he indicated he would have supported Macron's list.

Other speculated list leaders included Édouard Philippe, François Bayrou, Nicolas Hulot, Nathalie Kosciusko-Morizet, Sylvie Goulard, Daniel Cohn-Bendit, Arnaud Danjean, and Michel Barnier. Pierre Moscovici ruled out the possibility, as did Barnier, Jean-Yves Le Drian, Bayrou, Danjean, Daniel Cohn-Bendit, and Thomas Pesquet. Outgoing Green MEP Karima Delli, ministers Marlène Schiappa and Brune Poirson, deputy Amélie de Montchalin, Pascal Canfin, head of the French section of the World Wide Fund for Nature (WWF), and former France Inter journalist Bernard Guetta were also considered potential candidates. Canfin declined to lead the list on 16 November, and in late January 2019, Laurence Tubiana, president of the European Climate Foundation and former COP21 negotiator, was mentioned as a possibility, as were Le Drian, sailor Maud Fontenoy, justice minister Nicole Belloubet, and Emmanuelle Wargon.

On 17 December 2017, at the congress of the Democratic Movement (MoDem), Christophe Castaner said he supported an "enlarged list" for the European elections based on their alliance, and on 26 September 2018, the movement officially announced the opening of applications for prospective candidates from civil society, receiving 2,673 in total, winnowed by an investiture committee chaired by Jean-Marc Borello. Former Élysée advisor Stéphane Séjourné was designated campaign director on 29 October, tasked with creating a list alongside Agir, and seeking a lead candidate with a "green profile". For the MoDem, Bayrou selected Régis Lefebvre to serve as deputy campaign director.

On 15 February, Challenges revealed that EELV MEP Pascal Durand would be on the list in an electable position and Séjourné in the top 25 places. The centre-right party Agir proposed several candidates for the list, including two in electable position: Nicolas Barnier (the son of Michel Barnier and a parliamentary assistant), as well as Fabienne Keller, Gilles Boyer, Élisabeth Morin-Chartier, and Xavier Fournier. In an interview published in Challenges on 6 February, Radical Movement co-president Laurent Hénart indicated that the movement would likely vote to join a common list, sparking dissent among some ex-PRG members including co-president Sylvia Pinel, who announced her departure from the party to resurrect the PRG on two days later. The candidates it proposed included outgoing MEP Dominique Riquet, Olga Johnson, and Mélanie Fortier. One outgoing MEP, Jean Arthuis, announced that he would not seek to run again in 2019, and Agir MEP Tokia Saïfi also retired, as did the party's other MEP Élisabeth Morin-Chartier after learning she would not be in electable position on the list. Foreign nationals were also be on the list, including former Italian undersecretary for European affairs Sandro Gozi. After declining to run as a lead candidate, Canfin ultimately appeared in second on the list.

La République En Marche considered alliances with similar European political parties including Citizens in Spain and the Democratic Party in Italy, as well as parties outside of the Alliance of Liberals and Democrats for Europe (ALDE). Pieyre-Alexandre Anglade was delegated with the task of forming contacts with potential European partners. On 9 September 2018, Guy Verhofstadt, leader of the ALDE group, claimed that La République En Marche would ally with ALDE, which Castaner denied. Reports in October indicated Macron and Dutch prime minister Mark Rutte reached an agreement in principle for an alliance, though Anglade emphasized that ALDE parties would merely serve as the foundation, with EPP parties on the right such as Civic Platform in Poland and New Democracy in Greece as well as PES parties on the left including the Democratic Party in Italy and the Social Democratic Party of Austria in consideration. The party considered recruiting MEPs to form a group after the election. Following the airing of a report on France 2 on 11 March about ALDE's financial backing from Monsanto, manufacturer of glyphosate, the party announced that it would not join the ALDE, leading the latter to announce it would no longer accept corporate donations. Verhofstadt later announced on 2 May that the ALDE group would be dissolved after the elections to ally and create a new group.

Union of Democrats and Independents 

On 15 December 2018, Lagarde launched the party's campaign at its extraordinary congress, hoping to gain the support of pro-European voters who were not necessarily in favor of Macron's ideas on Europe. The party is also seeking to gain support from LR voters disillusioned by the hard-right political line of Wauquiez. Former LR vice president Virginie Calmels as well as general Pierre de Villiers were approached as potential candidates. However, Calmels later denied she was contacted and ruled out working with the UDI. Xavier Bertrand planned to appear at the launch of the UDI congress remotely, but reiterated that he did not support a federal Europe did support the UDI list. The UDI list includes former MEP Nora Berra, an Auvergne-Rhône-Alpes regional councilor elected on the LR list who later quit the party to protest its hard-right positioning, in second position, as well as longtime centrist Louis Giscard d'Estaing, son of Valéry Giscard d'Estaing, in third. While the party's sole remaining MEP Patricia Lalonde initially supported the principle of an independent list, she later urged the party to join the LR list, expressing support for Bellamy and Wauquiez; Lalonde did not seek another mandate in the elections.

The Republicans 

On 18 November, Le Journal du Dimanche reported that LR leader Laurent Wauquiez was considering 33-year-old Catholic philosopher François-Xavier Bellamy as a candidate to lead the LR list in 2019, though his political inexperience and conservative profile initially raised concerns. Wauquiez decided to submit three names to the CNI on 29 January, naming not only Bellamy but Agnès Evren and Arnaud Danjean as top candidates for the list, balancing the various strands of the party, with Evren close to Valérie Pécresse and Danjean a committed pro-European close to Alain Juppé. On 29 January, the CNI validated the nominations of Bellamy, Evren, and Danjean with 38 out of 40 votes. Other potential list leaders included Laurent Wauquiez, who declined, Virginie Calmels, Damien Abad, Nadine Morano, Jean Leonetti, Arnaud Danjean, Luc Ferry, Brice Hortefeux, Pierre de Villiers, Éric Woerth, Christian Jacob, Geoffroy Didier, Philippe Juvin, Michel Dantin, and Arnaud Danjean, though Leonetti declined, Ferry was uninterested, and Dantin decided instead to seek another term as mayor of Chambéry in 2020. Pécresse, Rachida Dati, and Michel Barnier also declined to lead the LR list.

In an interview published on 10 March 2018 in Le Journal du Dimanche, Thierry Mariani militated for an alliance with Le Pen, and was subsequently threatened with expulsion from the party; he ultimately joined the RN list. On 9 October, Wauquiez ruled out the possibility of alliances with Debout la France, La République En Marche!, or the National Rally in a letter addressed to Nicolas Dupont-Aignan. On 12 February 2019, Hervé Morin of The Centrists met with Wauquiez about a possible alliance for two out of the top 20 places on the list. On 6 March, the LR national investiture committee designated the first 26 candidates on the list. Alexandre Vergnes, general secretary of Hunting, Fishing, Nature and Traditions (CPNT), was initially slated to appear in 13th – and later 15th – position, but was later demoted to 30th; ultimately, the party announced on 11 April that its candidates would be Martine Aury in 48th and Pascal Marie in 31st. Geoffroy Didier was appointed campaign director in March. Despite pressure from La République En Marche to support their list ahead of the 2020 municipal elections and implied threats not to support them in case of their refusal denounced by some as "blackmail", "Macron-compatible" mayors (including Arnaud Robinet and Christian Estrosi) largely backed Bellamy's list.

Among outgoing MEPs, Nadine Morano, Brice Hortefeux, Alain Cadec, Franck Proust, Geoffroy Didier, and Angélique Delahaye sought to stand as candidates, while Françoise Grossetête, Élisabeth Morin-Chartier, Michèle Alliot-Marie, Alain Lamassoure, Jérôme Lavrilleux, Renaud Muselier, and Maurice Ponga did not seek the party's investiture, with Rachida Dati also opting out in view of the 2020 municipal elections in Paris. Marc Joulaud and Philippe Juvin are also not running for another term.

Debout la France 

On 19 January 2018, Europe 1 revealed that Nicolas Dupont-Aignan, leader of Debout la France, appeared to close the door to an alliance with the National Rally (RN) while still appealing for a "union of patriots" that could yet include members of the National Rally. On 20 March, the National Centre of Independents and Peasants (CNIP) voted unanimously to join Dupont-Aignan's "The Lovers of France" (Les Amoureux de la France), a political formation including the Christian Democratic Party of Jean-Frédéric Poisson and mayor of Béziers Robert Ménard. On 31 May, the three figures of "The Lovers of France" presented a "common program" with president of the European Conservatives and Reformists (ECR) group Ryszard Legutko in attendance, coinciding with the defection of FN MEP Bernard Monot to join DLF and the publication of an open letter from Le Pen inviting Dupont-Aignan to form a common list, which the latter subsequently rejected publicly. On 23 September, Dupont-Aignan officially announced that he intended to lead a "union list" of the right in the 2019 European elections, and DLF officially concluded its alliance with the ECR on 21 December.

RN MEP Sylvie Goddyn, who was expelled from the party on 19 October 2018 after indicating her support for Dupont-Aignan's initiative for a union list, initially planned to appear on the party's list, as did Poisson. According to a report in Le Figaro, Dupont-Aignan also sought to invite Jean Lassalle to lead his list but was rebuffed, as was the case with Thierry Mariani, who chose to join the RN list. Jeannette Bougrab also refused to join the list, while both Dupont-Aignan and Le Pen failed to recruit LR member Erik Tegnér. DLF attempted to draft another LR figure, Malika Sorel, while UBS whistleblower Stéphanie Gibaud became a candidate on the DLF list. On 11 February, L'Opinion reported that wealthy financier and writer Charles Gave would appear on the DLF list and provide the party with nearly 2 million euros in funding, while his daughter Emmanuelle Gave would also be on the list in an electable position. After Quotidien revealed the younger Gave's history of controversial tweets, DLF announced on 20 February that she would not be nominated, thus losing the elder Gave's guarantee of funding. Following the departure of the Gaves and denial of loans, the party relied on 1.2 million in funding via a "people's loan" from supporters, in addition to around 1 million euros provided by candidates on the list.

On 28 March 2019, Dupont-Aignan unveiled the first 23 candidates on the list, excluding Poisson because of his alleged refusal to embrace a collective approach, with outgoing MEPs Monot and Goddyn also absent "by mutual agreement". Poisson reportedly threatened to launch his own list with Gave after being told he would appear in fifth position, rather than third as originally planned. Despite their participation in Les Amoureux de la France, Ménard and Nicolas Dhuicq ultimately supported the list of the RN.

National Rally 

According to a report in L'Obs on 22 November 2018, Jordan Bardella, the 23-year-old head of the party's youth wing Génération Nation, was favored by Le Pen to lead the list. and on 7 January 2019, Louis Aliot confirmed that Bardella would lead the party's list in the European elections after being confirmed unanimously by the members of the RN's leadership. Two LR members, former minister Thierry Mariani and Jean-Paul Garraud, as well as economist Hervé Juvin, appeared on the party's list. In addition, André Rougé, who advised Le Pen during the presidential campaign and another ex-UMP member, employed in the mayoral office of Jacques Chirac until 1995, was also on the list. A number of other lead candidates were considered but did not ultimately run. On 1 December 2017, Nicolas Bay announced that Marine Le Pen would not lead the party's list in 2019. Juvin was also considered a possibility, and on 12 October 2018, Aliot confirmed said he would seek to become lead candidate, but announced on 20 November that he would instead seek the mayoralty of Perpignan in the 2020 municipal elections.

On 13 December 2017, Le Pen claimed that she wanted an alliance with Nicolas Dupont-Aignan, president of Debout la France, and met with Dupont-Aignan the same day to discuss "a possible partnership", but was rebuked a month later, and subsequently published an open letter seeking an alliance on 31 May 2018, only to receive his rejection again on 3 June. RN MEP Sylvie Goddyn was expelled from the party on 19 October 2018 after indicating her openness to Dupont-Aignan's initiative for a union list on the right.

Le Pen campaigned with Bardella at public meetings on Saturday afternoons in 20 small communes over the course of a campaign, the cost of which is anticipated to be around 4 million euros, in addition to a single major campaign event in a regional capital on 1 May, with Hénin-Beaumont mayor Steeve Briois appointed campaign director. Like La France Insoumise, the party launched an appeal for a "popular loan", soliciting donations from supporters in order to finance its campaign after being denied loans by French banks, and on 23 April announced that it raised 4 million euros using this scheme, which promised to repay lenders with 5% interest. Le Pen and Matteo Salvini plan to hold a joint campaign meeting in Italy in mid-May, likely in Milan on 18 May.

The Patriots 

On 23 November 2017, Florian Philippot announced that his movement, The Patriots (Les Patriotes), would present candidates in the 2019 European elections, fighting for the French exit from the European Union. The party had three MEPs, including Sophie Montel and Mireille d'Ornano, though Montel quit the party on 5 July 2018. Philippot launched the party's campaign for the European elections with the publication of his book Frexit, setting out his vision of Europe, in September 2018. Despite his hopes to build a cross-party list, his appeals to Henri Guaino, François Asselineau, and Jean Lassalle went unreciprocated. Lacking public financing, Philippot called for donations to help fund the party's campaign. As with other parties, the movement sought to recruit gilets jaunes onto its list, with Philippot seeking to register the name with the National Institute of Industrial Property (INPI) as well. Philippot confirmed on 22 February that his party would have the financial means to contest the elections, saying that he would lead the list, followed by d'Ornano in second place. On 30 April, Philippot filed his list, which was joined by members of Jean-François Barnaba's list Jaunes et citoyens; Barnaba himself is ninth on the list.

On April 24, close to the deadline for filing of lists, Philippot publicly called for a common list with Asselineau; according to L'Opinion, he delegated Thibaud Lonjon with the task of soliciting an alliance, offering 300,000 euros in additional financing for the list (which had then already raised around 1.2 million euros). In addition to Asselineau, Philippot sought a last-minute alliance with Dupont-Aignan, this time offering 400,000 euros for the third spot on the list, but was again rejected, with Bertrand Dutheil de La Rochère confirming these approaches.

Popular Republican Union 

On 18 November 2017, François Asselineau, founder of the Popular Republican Union (UPR), said at the party congress in Tours that he would "probably" be a candidate on the party's list in the 2019 European elections. Asselineau intends to leverage the party's online presence to help raise funds from its 32,000 members.

Gilets jaunes

Present lists 
In a press release on 29 April, Francis Lalanne announced that he would present a list under the banner of Alliance jaune on 30 April, having allied with the abortive RIC list now led by Jérémy Clément, with a financial guarantee of 800,000 euros from Jean-Marc Governatori, co-secretary of the Independent Ecological Alliance (AEI) – allied with the Greens – in order to ensure the list would be able to contest the elections. The list was led by Lalanne, with Sophia Albert-Salmeron in second and Clément in third position. This effort began following the publication of an open letter signed by Lalanne and Governatori, co-secretary of the Independent Ecological Alliance (AEI), on 7 December 2018 supporting the principle of a gilets jaunes list. On 17 December, Lalanne announced the launch of the Rassemblement gilet jaune citoyen list, though was opposed by many gilets jaunes who felt that he did not represent them. According to Le Figaro, Jean-François Barnaba was expected to be chosen as the lead candidate for this list, despite having once considered launching his own list, but on 22 March instead announced that he wanted to lead his own list, Jaunes et citoyens, which later allied with Philippot's list, The Patriots, with ten candidates in non-electable positions.

On 3 March, Christophe Chalençon announced the creation of the Évolution Citoyenne (Citizen Evolution) list for the European elections. Though Chalençon is a notable figure of the movement, he  says the list is not a list of "yellow vests", even if most of its candidates are, but consists of members of civil society representing "citizens of the left and right".

Another list, Mouvement pour l'Initiative Citoyenne, which supports implementing the RIC at the national and European level, was selected by drawing lots, though it existed long before the movement, with its foundation in 2006 and presence in the 2009 elections. Yvan Bachaud, spokesman for the list (led by Gilles Helgen), reiterated on 6 May that the list has no connection to the gilets jaunes movement, and is only focused on supporting the RIC.

Other parties ultimately included gilets jaunes on their lists, including the French Communist Party (PCF) with three, two present on the pro-Frexit Popular Republican Union (UPR) list led by François Asselineau, and right-wing activist Benjamin Cauchy in 9th position for Debout la France (DLF), of which he was already a member and spokesperson.

Abortive lists 

On 4 December 2018, amid the gilets jaunes protests, Jean-François Barnaba announced that he intended to prepare a list of gilets jaunes to contest the European elections in 2019. On 10 December, Hayk Shahinyan announced that he would also attempt to constitute a list. Christophe Chalençon, one of the leaders of the "free" gilets jaunes, also supported the ambition of presenting a list in the European elections. Shahinyan's association, Gilets Jaunes, le mouvement, was the best-organized group, with 85,000 euros and 14,000 members.

On 23 January, the group announced in a press release that they would present a list called Ralliement d'initiative citoyenne (RIC, or Citizens' Initiative Rally, referencing the acronym of the proposed referendum desired by many gilets jaunes) led by Ingrid Levavasseur, a 31-year-old nurse assistant, and also revealed the first 10 names on the list, with the remaining spots open to applications. Shahinyan was chosen as campaign director. The announcement of a list provoked largely negative reactions among other gilets jaunes, many of whom were skeptical and considered them opportunists. Marc Doyer, eighth on the list, was revealed to have previously supported Macron, and withdrew from the list on 28 January. Shahinyan also stepped down as campaign director, citing doubts. On 31 January, Brigitte Lapeyronie, ex-UDI member and trade unionist, also announced that she would not stand as a candidate due to personal reasons. Barnaba, who hoped to lead his own list, also quit. On 13 February, Levavasseur announced that she would quit the RIC list, a week after a controversial meeting with Luigi Di Maio, and announced on RTL on 11 March that she would not attempt to present a list. Two others on the list, Côme Dunis and Ayouba Sow, confirmed their departure from the initiative on 26 February. Jérémy Clément said that he would be ready to be lead candidate for the list unless a "more legitimate" candidate emerged. On 5 April, Frédéric Mestdjian, spokesman for the RIC list, said that he expected to arrive at an alliance with "two or three" other lists of yellow vests within weeks, working with Lalanne's list.

On 29 January, a gilet jaune leader from Nice, Patrick Cribouw, announced his intention to present a list in the European elections under the banner of Union jaune. Spokesman Fréderic Ibanez claimed the list already had around 40 candidates and would attempt to remain apolitical in terms of its composition. Appearing on BFM TV on 2 March, Cribouw claimed the list was complete and called for alliances with Mouraud, Levavasseur, and Valette. On 1 February, Thierry Paul Valette announced the creation of a European election list under the banner of the Rassemblement des Gilets jaunes citoyens, claiming to have already chosen 10 candidates, after having quit Lalanne's initiative, but subsequently announced on 26 April that he would not present a list. Shahinyan and Chalençon announced their intention to create the mouvement alternatif citoyen (MAC) and hold a member vote in March to decide whether to present a list. For her part, Jacline Mouraud launched a party, Les Émergents, on 27 January, and reiterated her intention not to present a list in the European elections but the 2020 municipal elections.

Many of Macron's supporters considered gilets jaunes lists desirable, given that an internal poll suggested that such a list would siphon votes from the opposition and increase turnout by engaging traditional abstentionists, paradoxically strengthening Macron as a result. Others, however, warned that an electoral transformation of the movement could result in a French Five Star Movement.

Absent lists

New Anticapitalist Party 
While the New Anticapitalist Party (NPA) initially sought to ally with Lutte Ouvrière (LO), with its national political council of 6 and 7 October 2018 approving of the principle of an alliance by a 37–22 vote (with 5 abstentions and 10 non-participants), talks broke down in November 2018. On 28 January, the NPA indicated that it would attempt to present a list despite its serious financial difficulties, soliciting donations from its members, with its leadership deciding on 24 March whether to contest the European elections. On 18 February, the party reiterated its desire to be present in the elections, requiring a million euros to ensure its ability to do so. The NPA ultimately announced on 25 March that it would not present a list in 2019, lacking the financial means to do so, and called on its supporters to vote for Lutte Ouvrière.

Résistons! 
In an interview published in Valeurs actuelles on 3 May 2018, former presidential candidate Jean Lassalle announced his intention to present a list under the banner of his movement Résistons! in the European elections, hoping to defend the "territories and rurality" from the "European supranationalism, globalization and hypercapitalism". He voted "no" in the 1992 Maastricht Treaty referendum as well as the 2005 referendum on the European Constitution and opposed the Treaty of Lisbon in 2008. He intended to create a list composed of local mayors, farmers, business executives, and professionals inadequately represented in politics. On 6 March 2019, Lassalle indicated he had about a "quarter" of the 800,000 to 1 million euros needed to finance the campaign, and ultimately announced on 11 April 2019 that he would not present a list in the European elections, lacking sufficient funding.

Other electoral lists 
On 23 November 2018, Delphine Batho of Ecology Generation confirmed that she intended to present a list, and on 18 March 2019, she confirmed alongside Antoine Waechter of the Independent Ecological Movement (MEI) that Dominique Bourg would lead their Urgence Écologie list, also supported by the Movement of Progressives (MdP), as well as a significant contingent of the Union of Democrats and Ecologists (UDE).

The Animalist Party presented a list in the elections led by Hélène Thouy, with several notable candidates including journalist Henry-Jean Servat and Sylvie Rocard, wife of the late former prime minister Michel Rocard, as well as backing from numerous film and television personalities, and former MEP Michèle Striffler in 11th position.

Other lists include the monarchist and anti-EU Alliance Royale list led by Robert de Prévoisin; La ligne claire, a far-right identitarian list led by Renaud Camus, known for promoting the Great Replacement conspiracy theory, with Karim Ouchikh, president of Souveraineté, Identité et Libertés (SIEL), in third position; the list of the Pirate Party, a pro-transparency pirate party led by Florie Marie; Démocratie représentative, a far-left list led by Hadama Traoré emanating from the citizen collective La révolution est en marche; Parti des citoyens européens (PACE), led by Audric Alexandre, which calls for a federal Europe; the Liste de la reconquête, the list of the extreme-right party Dissidence française (DF) led by the 30-year-old Vincent Vauclin, which includes a number of ex-RN candidates; the European Federalist Party (PFE), a federalist party led by its president Yves Gernigon; Allons Enfants, a pro-European "party of youth" consisting entirely of candidates under 30 and led by 22-year-old Sciences Po graduate Sophie Caillaud; Décroissance 2019, a pro-degrowth and radical ecologist list led by Thérèse Delfel; À voix égales, a feminist list led by Nathalie Tomasini, former lawyer for Jacqueline Sauvage; Neutre et actif, a list led by Cathy Denise Ginette Corbet to "fight against abstention" in the elections; the far-left Parti Révolutionnaire Communistes, a split from the PCF, led by national secretary Antonio Sanchez; Espéranto - langue commune équitable pour l'Europe, the list of Europe Démocratie Espéranto (EDE), led by Pierre Dieumegard, which calls for the designation of Esperanto as an official language; Les Oubliés de l'Europe, a list led by Olivier Bidou to defend the interests of "artisans, tradespeople, liberal professions, and the self-employed"; the Union Démocratique Pour La Liberté, Egalité, Fraternité (UDLEF), a centre-right federalist list consisting mostly of African immigrants led by business leader Christian Luc Person; and Une Europe au service des peuples, the list of the Union des démocrates musulmans français (Union of French Muslim Democrats, UDMF) led by Najib Azergui, which was validated after a delay due to incomplete paperwork.

Election platforms 
The table below is a summary of the platforms of the principal electoral lists in the European elections.

Opinion polls

Results 
On 4 May 2019, the names of 33 official electoral lists, validated by the Ministry of the Interior, were published in the Journal officiel de la République française, with their order determined by drawing lots. A 34th list entitled Une Europe au service des peuples, representing the Union des démocrates musulmans français (Union of French Muslim Democrats, UDMF) led by Najib Azergui, was later validated by the Ministry of the Interior after an initial delay, due to a lack of written consent from several candidates on the list. In all, a total of 2,686 candidates were represented on these 34 lists, the number of which surpasses the previous record of 20 at the national level in the 1999 elections and the average of 24 lists per constituency in the 2014 elections. Lacking the financial means to do so, most minor electoral lists were unable to distribute ballot papers at every polling site, instead requiring voters to print their own ballots published online; others, like the Pirate Party, only printed a fraction of ballots for each polling station, with those in particularly favorable areas targeted for ballots, to cut costs. Due to the Article 50 extension granted to the United Kingdom, 79 MEPs were considered to have been officially elected, but only 74 took their seats initially, with the other 5 "virtual" MEPs taking their seats upon the departure of the UK from the EU.

Comparisons for 2019 results for Europe Ecology – The Greens (EELV) are made with the combined score it received in 2014 of 8.95%, the Independent Ecological Alliance (AEI) with 1.12%, and Régions et Peuples Solidaires (R&PS) with 0.34% (representing 10.41% in total); for the Socialist Party (PS) common list including Place Publique and New Deal, with its score in 13.98% as well as that of New Deal with 2.90% (representing 16.88% in total); the score of the Union of Democrats and Independents (UDI) is compared to his number of seats in The Alternative  in 2014; and for the French Communist Party (PCF), his number of seats within the Left Front electoral alliance (including the Union for the Overseas).

By department

By region

Communes with at least 100,000 inhabitants

Elected MEPs 
Five MEPs were formally considered to have been elected in the elections, but did not take their seats until the departure of the UK from the EU.

Electorate

Aftermath and analysis 

Turnout, up by 7.7 points compared to the previous European elections, was the highest since the 1994 elections. The results of the election were a confirmation of the establishment of the National Rally and La Republique En Marche as the two strongest political forces, between them leading in every single department. Although it fell relative to 2014, elevated turnout also meant the RN also attained a new record vote total in the European elections. Pre-election polls failed to capture both the rise of the Greens and abysmal result of The Republicans. Even if surveys in the closing weeks uniformly reflected an increase in estimated turnout, that alone did not explain the discrepancy between polls and the final result. Frédéric Dabi, deputy director general of the polling institute Ifop, admitted that pollsters missed the result, while Brice Teinturier, deputy managing director at Ipsos, suggested that the LR vote was more fragile than immediately visible, with their electorate less firm and many placing Loiseau's list as their second choice; the same was true for La Republique En Marche, with 17% of its backers then considering a vote for the Greens. Teinturier suggested that there had been a "double transfer" in votes in the closing weekend during the polling ban, with LR supporters moving Loiseau's list to prevent the RN from a first-place finish, the Greens depriving votes from the En Marche list, and a porous Socialist electorate compatible with both. Surveys indicated that nearly a quarter of voters made their choice only in the weekend before, with over half of EELV voters deciding within the last week alone, while retirees, who traditionally make up the LR vote, instead voted for the Renaissance list.

The results of the European elections in France were also viewed with interest for their potential implications in the upcoming municipal elections in 2020. In Paris, the Renaissance list came first with 33% of the vote, followed by the Greens with just under 20%, LR with a catastrophic score of just 10%, the Socialists on 8%, RN on 7%, and Mélenchon's France Insoumise on only 5%. Despite the overall vote share of the LREM list remaining relatively stable compared to Macron's result in 2017, the massive increase in support in the wealthier western arrondissements and decrease in support everywhere else in the city reflected the changing nature of its electoral base with the loss of its left flank. Even in Marseille, a stronghold of the right, the LR list received only 8% of the vote, whereas the National Rally led with just over 26% and the list backed by Mélenchon with just over 8% in his electoral fief.

In reaction to the results, the Élysée claimed that it perceived the outcome as a "disappointment", but "not a defeat", while pointing to EELV's strong showing as reflecting strong support for ecological issues which it had made central to the campaign, with no change in direction expected from the government. Interpretations of the RN's score were also qualified, described as a "victory but not a triumph", falling short of the 25% mark in late polls, matching its usual electoral results and marking a slight decrease from its share of the vote from 2014. Speaking after the RN's victory, Le Pen called for the immediate dissolution of the National Assembly after the "democratic rejection" of Macron with his list's second-place finish. For his part, Benoît Hamon decided to take time to reflect upon his next steps and to try to assist in uniting the left after his movement, Génération.s, fell short and failed to secure any seats. Despite implicit pressure on him to step down after overseeing the worst result for the right in its history, Laurent Wauquiez initially sought to remain at the helm of The Republicans, proposing an "Estates General" to update the party's strategy and propositions. The results were also a major disappointment for Mélenchon's France Insoumise with a score just over 6%, only narrowly ahead of the PS/Place Publique list, cut in third compared to the 2017 presidential election; like LR, it was also potentially a victim of tactical voting, potentially due to a strategic failure in framing the election as an anti-Macron referendum. Wauquiez ultimately announced his resignation as president of The Republicans a week later, on 2 June.

See also 
2020 French municipal elections
2022 French presidential election
Opinion polling on the Emmanuel Macron presidency

References

External links

Official results 
Results by region, department, constituency, canton, commune, and polling station 
Statements of principle for lists and candidates 
Full list of candidates (data.gouv.fr) 
Summary of programs of the principal lists 
Summary of backgrounds of lead candidates 
Official campaign clips 
Analysis of votes of the MEPs who served from 2014–2019 from Le Monde 
List of current French MEPs 

European Parliament elections in France
France
Europe